Lawrence Joseph Zahab (April 3, 1937 – March 21, 2022), known professionally as Lawrence Dane, was a Canadian actor and film producer, best known for his role as Lt. Preston in Bride of Chucky.

Life and career
Born in Masson, Quebec, Dane was raised in Ottawa, and was from a Lebanese family. He attended Ottawa Tech and LaSalle Academy.

He began acting at the stage as an old policeman in the play Our Town at Ottawa's Fisher Park Community Centre under Lynne Gorman's direction in 1958. His screen career began when he met film maker F. R. Crawley in the same year. Crawley gave him a job as an extra and stand-in for John Perkins as Constable Frank Scott in the TV series R.C.M.P.. In addition to acting, he cowrote and directed the film drama Heavenly Bodies (1984). His producing credits include The Rowdyman, written by and starring Gordon Pinsent, and the slasher film Rituals.

He was a Genie Award nominee for Best Supporting Actor at the 1st Genie Awards in 1980 for the film Running, and an Earle Grey Award nominee at the 10th ACTRA Awards in 1981 for the television film A Question of the Sixth.

Personal life
He married Mary Laurel MacIntosh in 1995, who survived him.

Death
Dane died from pancreatic cancer at Niagara-on-the-Lake, Ontario on March 21, 2022.

Filmography

Television

Stage

References

External links
 

1937 births
2022 deaths
Canadian male film actors
Canadian male television actors
Canadian male voice actors
Canadian people of Lebanese descent
Deaths from cancer in Ontario
Deaths from pancreatic cancer
Male actors from Quebec
People from Gatineau
20th-century Canadian male actors
21st-century Canadian male actors
Canadian people of Arab descent